Leptospira weilii is a pathogenic species of Leptospira.

References

External links
Type strain of Leptospira weilii at BacDive -  the Bacterial Diversity Metadatabase

weilii
Bacteria described in 1987